Leonard Jack Martin (24 November 1901 – 25 December 1967) was a British sailor who competed in the 1936 Summer Olympics. In 1936 he was a crew member of the British boat Lalage which won the gold medal in the 6 metre class.

External links

External links
 
 

1901 births
1967 deaths
British male sailors (sport)
Olympic gold medallists for Great Britain
Olympic sailors of Great Britain
Olympic medalists in sailing
Sailors at the 1936 Summer Olympics – 6 Metre
Medalists at the 1936 Summer Olympics